Matthew Hood OBE (born Dec 1985) is co-founder and Principal of Oak National Academy, the national online classroom and teacher resource hub created during the COVID-19 pandemic. He was appointed OBE (Officer of the Most Excellent Order of the British Empire) in 2020 for services to education.

Personal life

Born in the Lancashire seaside town of Morecambe and brought up between there and Blackpool as part of a "big, complicated, non-nuclear family". He was the youngest of five children. Despite describing his childhood as 'great', his family were not well off and he spent a "decent chunk" of his early childhood and late teens living in a caravan.

He attended Great Wood Primary School in Morecambe, St. Wilfrid's CofE Primary School in Halton on Lune and Lancaster Royal Grammar School. He went on to study Politics, Philosophy and Economics at the University of York.

He married Josh MacAlister, Founder of Frontline in June 2019 . They live in Cumbria, England.

Career
Hood trained to be an economics teacher through Teach First in 2007, teaching in Edmonton, Tottenham. He went on to become a policy adviser at the Department for Education, then North East Regional Director at Teach First, before becoming assistant head at Morecambe's Heysham High School (now Bay Leadership Academy).

In 2015 he founded the Institute for Teaching, a charity focused on developing and improving teachers' expertise. In March 2018 the Institute for Teaching merged with Ambition School Leadership to become Ambition Institute, an education charity tackling educational disadvantage through evidence-based professional development for teachers and school leaders.

Hood is also Chair at Bay Leadership Academy in Morecambe, Governor at  Lancaster and Morecambe College and an independent adviser to the Department for Education.

Hood is a founding trustee at  The Brilliant Club, a post he stepped down from in 2021. In 2015 he was awarded a Churchill Fellowship.

Hood co-founded Oak National Academy alongside David Thomas in 2020.

References 

Living people
Alumni of the University of York
1985 births